Kentucky Route 380 (KY 380) is a  state highway in the U.S. state of Kentucky. The highway connects different highways entirely within Hopkinsville, which is located in Christian County.

Route description
KY 380 begins at an intersection with KY 272 (Canton Street) in the west-central part of Hopkinsville, within Christian County, where the roadway continues as Navaho Trail. It travels to the south-southwest and curves to the southeast. It intersects KY 695 (Cox Mill Road) and curves to the east-southeast. It intersects KY 107 (Lafayette Road / South Virginia Street). It travels along the northern edge of Hopkinsville Country Club golf course and curves to the east. It intersects U.S. Route 41 Alternate (US 41 Alt.; Fort Campbell Boulevard). The two highways travel concurrently to the south-southeast. They cross over the South Fork Little River and split. KY 380 travels to the northeast and curves to the north-northeast. It crosses over some railroad tracks of CSX and curves back to the northeast. It then meets its eastern terminus, an intersection with US 41/KY 109 (East 9th Street). Here, the roadway continues as Trail of Tears Drive.

Major intersections

See also

References

0380
Transportation in Christian County, Kentucky